Bennett Family House is a historic home located at Monticello in Sullivan County, New York.  It was built in 1880 is a -story, wood frame, "L" shaped dwelling with a long 1-story rear wing.  The main block is three bays wide and two bays deep on a dressed stone foundation and topped by a gable roof. It features an ornate period interior.

It was added to the National Register of Historic Places in 2001.

References

Houses on the National Register of Historic Places in New York (state)
Houses completed in 1880
Houses in Sullivan County, New York
National Register of Historic Places in Sullivan County, New York